Titov, or female form Titova is a Russian surname - composed of the Latin name Titus and affix -ov, meaning "descendent of". It may refer to:

People
 Alexey Nikolayevich Titov, a composer
 Egor Titov, a former football player
 Gennady Titov, former KGB general
 German Titov, an ice hockey player
 Gherman Titov, a cosmonaut, piloted Vostok 2 in 1961
 Konstantin Titov, a politician, leader of the Russian Party of Social Democracy
 Lyudmila Titova, a Russian speed skater
 Nicolai Alexeyevich Titov, a composer
 Vasily Polikarpovich Titov, a composer
 Viktor Abrosimovich Titov, a film director on IMDB.
 Vladimir G. Titov, a cosmonaut, first mission Soyuz T-8 in 1983
 Yuri Titov, an Olympic gymnast

Places
 Titov, a crater on Earth's moon
 List of places named after Tito

Russian-language surnames